Axel Revold (24 December 1887 – 11 April 1962) was a Norwegian painter, illustrator, and art professor at the Norwegian National Academy of Fine Arts for twenty years. He was highly decorated for his merits.

Personal life
Revold was born in Ålesund as the son of merchant Julius Revold and Johanne Hjelpsten. He was married to Ingrid Müller from 1915 to 1928. From 1929 he was married to painter Irmelin Nansen, the daughter of Fridtjof Nansen and Eva Nansen. He is the father of artist Dagny Hald. He died in Bærum in 1962.

Career
Revold initiated engineering studies in Kristiania in 1906, and also followed evening courses at Den kgl. Tegneskole in Kristiania. In 1908 he discontinued his engineering education and moved to Paris as a student of Henri Matisse for two years. He was also inspired by Paul Cézanne and Kees van Dongen.

Among Revold's paintings are Apasjer from 1912 and Fiskere på Middelhavet from 1914. He is represented in National Gallery of Norway with more than twenty paintings, including Italienerinne from 1913, Fiskevær from 1916, Morgen from 1927 and Fiskerflåten drar ut from 1935. His painting Kongens hjemkomst from 1945 is located at the Royal Palace in Oslo. He also painted frescos and decorated churches.

Revold was appointed professor at the Norwegian National Academy of Fine Arts from 1925 to 1946. In 1941, during the occupation of Norway by Nazi Germany, Revold had to leave the academy. Together with fellow professor Jean Heiberg they were secretly running an undercover art academy in Oslo. Their academy was called "The Factory", after its first location in a closed corset factory. They were later located at Lauritz Falk's home and at Johannes Sejersted Bødtker's atelier at Holmenkollen.

In 1955 he was awarded the Prince Eugen Medal and decorated Commander of the Royal Norwegian Order of St. Olav. He was a Commander of the Danish Order of the Dannebrog, the Swedish Order of the Polar Star, and the Finnish Order of the White Rose. He was Officer of the French l'Instruction Publique, and a Knight of the Legion of Honour.

References

1887 births
1962 deaths
People from Ålesund
Norwegian illustrators
20th-century Norwegian painters
Norwegian male painters
Commanders of the Order of the Polar Star
Commanders of the Order of the Dannebrog
Chevaliers of the Légion d'honneur
Fresco painters
Recipients of the Prince Eugen Medal
20th-century Norwegian male artists